An all-time Universiade medal table from 1959 Summer Universiade to 2019 Summer Universiade and 1960 Winter Universiade to 2023 Winter Universiade, is tabulated below. The table is the consequence of the sum of the medal tables of the various editions of the Summer Universiade and the Winter Universiade. The results code are attributed to the IOC country code.

Doping
The outcomes of doping cases have resulted in changes to this medal table.

Summer Universiade
As of 2019 Summer Universiade.

Winter Universiade
As of 2023 Winter Universiade.

Combined Total
Last updated after the 2023 Winter Universiade.

See also
 List of Universiade medals by host nation
 All-time Olympic Games medal table
 All-time Paralympic Games medal table
 All-time Youth Olympic Games medal table

References

External links
FISU web site

Universiade
medal table